Halo 4: Forward Unto Dawn is a military science fiction web series set in the universe of the Halo franchise. Forward Unto Dawn consists of five 15-minute episodes released weekly starting on October 5, 2012, and was later released as a single film on DVD and Blu-ray and was later put on Netflix in 2013. A coming-of-age story in the twenty-sixth century set 31 years before the events of Halo 4, Forward Unto Dawn follows Thomas Lasky, a cadet at a military training academy who is unsure of his future within the military but feels pressured to follow in the footsteps of his mother and brother. The academy is attacked by the Covenant, a religious alliance of aliens. Lasky and his surviving squad mates are rescued by the Master Chief and must escape the planet.

The series was produced as a marketing effort for the video game Halo 4 intended to widen the audience of the Halo series and as a stepping stone to a potential Halo film. It was written by Aaron Helbing and Todd Helbing, and directed by Stewart Hendler. Forward Unto Dawn was shot in Vancouver over 25 days in May 2012 on a budget just under . It has just under 500 shots with computer generated imagery, approximately a quarter of what a feature film would have, but the visual effects received praise from reviewers.

Forward Unto Dawn received a Streamy Award and several of the crew received awards for their work editing, producing and filming of it. The series also won a Motion Picture Sound Editors Golden Reel Award for sound editing. Reviewers were impressed by the special effects and action-packed second act, but found that the plot was too slow in the first half and most of the characters were under-developed. The series was also nominated for a Primetime Emmy Award for main title design.

Development
After the success of previous live-action promotional shorts, Landfall and The Life, 343 Industries, the studio in charge of development for the Halo franchise, wanted to use a live action series to appeal to an audience of people unfamiliar with the Halo games. The director of franchise business management at 343 Industries, Matt McClosky, explained the intended audience by saying that, "You see something that looks like a video game, you're going to get the same crowd you always get." The live-action format was also chosen for its ability to better develop characters; the series is used to introduce the character Thomas Lasky to the Halo universe before his role in the video game Halo 4. The developers wanted a protagonist with more emotion than Master Chief (whose face is never seen), to not only convey an understanding of the universe, but to better engage unfamiliar viewers.

Microsoft considers the series "the next step" between advertising material and a full-length film after the failure of a previous effort, and aimed to produce a standalone series that could be enjoyed without necessarily playing the games. The budget for the series was almost USD $10 million, Microsoft's largest investment in a live-action promotion. Director Stewart Hendler said "We're either the best-funded web series of all time, a sort of mid-road healthy TV pilot, or a super-low-budget movie." When the idea of directing a video game based web series was pitched to Hendler he declined, saying he was not interested in video game adaptions unless the subject was Halo. Hendler was already a fan of the series, having read the novels and played the games.

Potential writers were interviewed by 343 Industries, and some were selected to write a draft of a script. Aaron and Todd Helbing wrote a pitch set on Harvest, the first planet to be attacked by the Covenant (see Halo: Contact Harvest). Although 343 Industries decided not to use it, the Helbing brothers' script was the most complete and demonstrated the best understanding of the Halo universe so they were chosen to write Forward Unto Dawn. The final plot was developed by 343 Industries, Frank O'Connor, and the Helbings with the intention of introducing a new character to tie into Halo 4, which their Harvest script did not, and to explore "the least-well-known part of the Halo universe". In addition to providing input on the script, 343 Industries had a representative on set at all times to ensure that the series did not break canon.

Shooting and special effects

The series was shot over twenty-five days in May 2012 in the forests around Vancouver, at Simon Fraser University and at additional stages in Burnaby. The Herzog and Company production team was in Vancouver for three months with set design by Legacy Effects, the same company that worked on the previous shorts.

The Warthog (a 4WD off-road vehicle with a mounted minigun) that appears in Forward Unto Dawn is the same one that was produced by Weta Workshop and used in Landfall. Stunt driver Johnathon Kralt found that the prop "handles the roads extremely well for something that size and that height", and the four-wheel steering was an advantage for drifting. Many chase shots were made using a Mercedes-Benz ML 55 pursuit vehicle with a camera boom mounted to the roof. Another rig involved towing the Warthog on a low trailer so that cameras could focus on an actor while the vehicle was being "driven".

The visual effects supervisor, John Sullivan, hired Arc Productions to create just under 500 shots with computer generated imagery, between a quarter and a third of what a blockbuster film would feature. The Covenant that appear are all completely computer generated, as is the academy's space elevator, weapons' muzzle flashes and a few shots of Master Chief. Hendler felt that the visual effects were the area that needed particular focus and spent a much larger percentage of the budget on the Master Chief costume and computer generated imagery than is normal for a production.

One scene involves a Covenant Elite stalking the cadets in the armoury. The geometry of the Elite already exists for the Halo video games but it couldn't be directly transferable to the Mental Ray renderer so it had to be re-topologized in ZBrush and Maya. The outdoor attack on the academy was filmed at Simon Fraser University and required photogrammetric reconstruction and laser measurement to add the aliens and weapons lighting effects in a convincing manner. A later scene in the forest was too complex to use the same techniques, lacking the geometric shapes of the university campus.  Instead, Arc visual effects supervisor Terry Bradley scattered LEDs on the set. By measuring the distance between LEDs the studio could model the area with software, and then used SketchUp and Maya to add the weapons fire. The shattering of the pink "needles" fired by the Covenant was rendered in Houdini as the shots hit concrete and Master Chief's armour.

The opening sequences of each episode show Cortana, an artificial intelligence, aboard the spaceship Forward Unto Dawn as she malfunctions. The five sequences were entirely computer generated by Polynoid, the animation team of Blacklist, a production company.

Setting
Forward Unto Dawn takes place on a fictional planet, Circinius-IV, one of many that humans have colonized outside of the solar system. The protagonist, Thomas Lasky, is aboard a spaceship named the UNSC Infinity in 2557. Forward Unto Dawn portrays his memory of the events on Circinius-IV in 2526, when he is a cadet at the Corbulo Academy, a training facility for the children of high-ranking UNSC officers. The UNSC is training the cadets for war with insurrectionists on various colony planets.

A Covenant army attacks the academy causing confusion and panic. Although not made clear in Forward Unto Dawn, the Covenant are a theocratic collection of alien species that are religiously offended by Humanity and seek to eradicate it. The events portrayed in Forward Unto Dawn are some of the earliest encounters with the Covenant, and the characters other than Master Chief were unaware of their existence.

Casting and characters
The production team was responsible for casting, but Microsoft maintained a final say. The decision to use Alex Puccinelli instead of Steve Downes, the previous voice artist of Master Chief, was approved by Microsoft. The actors playing the cadets attended a boot camp before shooting to raise their fitness and accustom them to assault courses and rifle drills in their armour costumes. Cast members drove themselves to overexertion in the training, causing some to vomit, which they saw as a bonding experience.

Tom Green plays the protagonist Thomas Lasky, a cadet at Corbulo Academy and Ty Olsson plays the adult rendition. Lasky is "ambivalent about his role in the military", considering diplomacy a better option to warfare. Lasky is from a military family; his mother is a colonel and his brother Cadmon (played by Max Carver) was an ODST (Orbital Drop Shock Troopers - a special forces unit in the Halo universe), but Thomas is uninterested in becoming an officer. Green portrayed Lasky as a "regular teenager", unsure of his future. As research for the role, Green was required to watch the previous shorts and read the "Halo encyclopedia" that 343 Industries uses to preserve the Halo canon. Executive producer Josh Feldman considers Lasky an important character in the Halo universe beyond just Forward Unto Dawn and Halo 4.

Daniel Cudmore was cast to play the role of Master Chief largely due to his height and physique. The director, Stewart Hendler, wanted to contrast the size of Master Chief to that of the teenage cadets; Cudmore is 203 centimetres (6'8") tall whereas the actors playing the cadets were deliberately chosen to be "short, scrawny freshmen". In order to accurately portray Master Chief, Cudmore watched the Landfall shorts by Neill Blomkamp and read the Halo novels for the history of the character, having already played the games. Cudmore expressed interest in the history of Master Chief, the character's view on war and his role as a soldier, as he was only required to portray a utilitarian character in the series. Cudmore thinks the character is torn between aiding the cadets and completing his mission, but Master Chief's confidence and actions inspire the cadets.

Legacy Effects took a body scan of Cudmore, then overlaid a 3D model provided by Microsoft and edited it to get proportions correct. A prototype was 3D printed and then used to make moulds for the final suit. The majority of the suit is rubber over a foam bodysuit, similar to a wetsuit, with a fibreglass helmet. Cudmore compared wearing it to walking through water, although he had to perform stunts in the suit as it was made only for his body. Cudmore repeatedly watched the video of his movements immediately after they were shot to ensure that they were deliberate but without appearing robotic, "trying to make his movements a little larger than life, but still with a sense of humanity to them." Both Hendler and Frank O'Connor praised Cudmore, not just for his physique but for moving in a fluid manner in the cumbersome suit.

Anna Popplewell plays Chyler Silva, a cadet who, contrary to Lasky's beliefs, is a full supporter of the war against the insurrectionists. Popplewell portrays Silva as a competent cadet who has been hardened by her childhood surrounded by insurrectionist violence. She had a romantic connection with Lasky that was interrupted by the Covenant attack. Popplewell was new to the Halo series when cast for the role but thinks that the characters and aesthetic of the series have the potential to draw in a new audience.

Other characters include cadets April Orenski, a senior cadet and squad leader, played by Enisha Brewster, Junjie Chen, played by Osric Chau, who is the only cadet without a military family and has gained entry to the academy through his own achievements, Dimah Tchakova played by Kat de Lieva, Walter Vickers played by Iain Belcher and Michael Sullivan, played by Masam Holden.

Episodes

Release
On April 30, 2012, Microsoft Studios announced that Forward Unto Dawn would play on Machinima Prime and Halo Waypoint (a marketing website for the Halo series) during the weeks leading up to the release of Halo 4. The series' first episode attracted five million views on YouTube within two weeks and, as of March 2013, has eleven million views. The second episode attracted three million views within two weeks and six million views by March 2013; however, these statistics do not include views on Halo Waypoint.

The series consists of five 15-minute shorts, the first released on October 5, 2012, with subsequent episodes released weekly. A 90-minute extended version is included with the Limited Edition version of Halo 4, and became available on Blu-ray, DVD, Xbox Video, iTunes and video on demand services on December 4, 2012. The Blu-ray and DVD versions contain bonus features including audio commentary from Stewart Hendler and 343 Industries, a live-action Red vs. Blue PSA entitled Sleeper, as well as vignettes and making-of documentaries. On January 18, 2013, Content Media Corporation announced that they had international distribution rights for Forward Unto Dawn for television.

McFarlane Toys produced 500 units of a collectible statue to tie-in with Forward Unto Dawn in December 2012. The statue is a thirty-six centimetre (14") tall model of Master Chief fighting a Hunter, as depicted in Forward Unto Dawn. On November 6, 2012, to coincide with the release of Halo 4, Mega Bloks released a model of the UNSC spaceship, Forward Unto Dawn. The model is approximately one metre (3') long and has scenes from both the video game and the web series.

Critical reception
Reviewers were divided on what standard to expect of the series and what to compare it to; the budget was beyond that of other web series but not on par with a film.

IGN reviewer Jesse Schedeen considered the cadets other than Lasky and Silva to be "ready-made cannon fodder," having received minimal development. This detracted from the quality of the third episode, as a betrayal by cadet Tchakova had little impact due to her shallow development. However, Schedeen did appreciate Green's acting in the last episode, noting that "[Silva's] death scene was handled very well, particularly as it forced Tom Green to shed his calm exterior and react much more emotionally." In his later review of the Blu-ray, Schedeen complimented the audio and video quality, as well as the inclusion of many vignettes, documentary featurettes and commentaries.

James Plath of Movie Metropolis also found the characters lacking in the first half, but noted that in the second half, the characters of Lasky and Silva "actually move beyond the clichés and pick up a personality along the way". Plath was impressed by the soundtrack, thinking it "worthy of any big-screen action flick" and also complimented the special effects saying "the CGI work is enhanced by high definition, not exposed by it." Overall however, he thought that despite the action being exciting, the "pedestrian" first half and "only adequate acting" would prevent Forward Unto Dawn appealing to an audience beyond existing gamers.

Official Xbox Magazines reviewer, Edwin Evans, appreciated the direction of the series; "Stewart Hendler's well-judged editing keeps the script from sinking under the weight of its own melodrama, and his close-ups never overstay their welcome, hiding the weaknesses of the inexperienced (but talented) cast." He also echoed Plath's thoughts on the slow first half and exciting second half.

Awards and nominations

See also
 Halo 4 Original Soundtrack
Halo: The Fall of Reach

References

External links
 Halo 4: Forward Unto Dawn at Xbox.com 
 

2012 web series debuts
2012 web series endings
Live-action films based on video games
2010s YouTube series
Works based on Halo (franchise)
Military science fiction films
Streamy Award-winning channels, series or shows